Campamento Albanta is a Spanish supernatural thriller streaming television series, starring Kimberley Tell, Pol Monen and Eva Llorach, among others. It was released in 2020 on Atresplayer Premium.

Premise 
The fiction, a medley of mystery, supernatural thriller, horror and science fiction, is set in a rehabilitation camp for young adults in the middle of the forest. The plot follows Olivia, who feigns a depression to enter the camp and thus discover the reasons for her brother's suicide soon after returning from a stay at the camp.

Cast

Production and release 
Produced by Lucky Road, the writing team was formed by Nico Frasquet and Amanda Encinas whereas Alfredo López directed the 6 episodes, featuring a running time of around 25 minutes. The series was shot in the northern hemisphere Summer of 2019 in Peguerinos, Province of Ávila.

While nominally presented under the Flooxer brand, Atresmedia rather programmed an original release on Atresplayer Premium on a two episodes per week basis, premiering on 26 July 2020 on the latter platform.

References 

2020s Spanish drama television series
2020 Spanish television series debuts
2020 Spanish television series endings
Spanish thriller television series
Atresplayer Premium original programming
Television shows filmed in Spain
Spanish LGBT-related television shows
2020s supernatural television series
Spanish mystery television series
Spanish horror fiction television series